A Night in Copenhagen is a live album by jazz saxophonist Charles Lloyd featuring a performance recorded in Copenhagen in 1983 by Lloyd with Michel Petrucciani, Palle Danielsson and Woody Theus with guest vocalist Bobby McFerrin.

Reception
The Allmusic review by Scott Yanow awarded the album 4 stars stating "Lloyd, coaxed out of retirement by Petrucciani, sounded virtually unchanged from his earlier days; the passion and enthusiasm were still there".

Track listing
All compositions by Charles Lloyd
 "Lotus Land (To Thakur and Trane)"  9:08
 "Lady Day"   7:22
 "El Encanto"     6:23
 "Third Floor Richard"    8:14
 "Night Blooming Jasmine"  14:23
 "Of Course, Of Course" Bonus Track on CD 9:45
 "Sweet Georgia Bright" Bonus Track on CD 11:45
 Recorded at the Copenhagen Jazz Festival, Copenhagen, Denmark on July 11, 1983

Personnel
Charles Lloyd – tenor saxophone (2, 5, 7), flute (3, 4, 6), Chinese oboe (1)
Michel Petrucciani – piano
Palle Danielsson – double bass
Woody Theus – drums
Bobby McFerrin – vocals (tracks 4 & 6)

References

Charles Lloyd (jazz musician) live albums
1985 live albums
Blue Note Records live albums